Udayamudaiyan is a village in the Pattukkottai taluk of Thanjavur district, Tamil Nadu, India.

Demographics 

As per the 2001 census, Udayamudaiyan had a total population of 528 with 241 males and 287 females. The sex ratio was 1191. The literacy rate was 65.61.

References 
 

Villages in Thanjavur district